Matthew James Burns (born 31 October 1985), known mononymously as Burns, is a Scottish record producer, songwriter, and DJ. His recent writing and production credits include  Lady Gaga, Britney Spears, Liam Payne, Little Mix, Louis Tomlinson, Pitbull, Ellie Goulding, Kacy Hill, Ariana Grande, Anitta, Ava Max, and others.

Early life
Burns' mother was an artist and painter, and his father was a professional heavyweight boxer. Burns began making music at the age of twelve, playing guitar and keyboards before discovering sampling as a teenager. At the age of 15, Burns started producing his own tracks, combining sound hardware from the seventies and eighties with modern music software and samples.

Musical career
BURNS was taken on by Three Six Zero for management. He was then chosen to warm up for every show of deadmau5's U.S. 30-day tour and subsequently joined Calvin Harris on his UK tour. He also released two EPs Turbo and Teknique on 2112 Records.

In 2010, BURNS released "Y.S.L.M (You Stopped Loving Me)" with French artist Fred Falke, also releasing his So Many Nights EP. In 2011, Burns released a track with NT89 entitled "Traffic" and went on to release "Iced Out" on Calvin Harris' Fly Eye label. In 2012, Burns secured a residency at The Wynn Hotel, Las Vegas while playing shows across America. He released "Lies" in September with remixes from Skream, Tiga, Acrobat and Otto Knows. The single entered the BBC Radio 1 playlist at C moving to B one week later and then on to A for 7 consecutive weeks. The track peaked at number 32 in the UK Singles Chart and at number 36 in the Netherlands.

BURNS began his solo residency at OMNIA nightclub in Las Vegas in 2016. In 2017, BURNS was signed by RCA Records. His first release on the label, "Far Gone feat. Johnny Yukon" was released in summer of that year. He followed with a second single "Angel" in April 2018, and also "Hands On Me" which featured Maluma and Rae Sremmurd. "Hands On Me" was the first English-speaking feature for Latin artist Maluma.

Discography

Compilation albums
2010 – This Is Burns 001 - European Sex Music - Part 1

Extended plays

Singles

As lead artist

As featured artist

Remixes

Productions

References

External links

 
 
 

Living people
1985 births
English record producers
English songwriters
English DJs
Electronic dance music DJs